New York (1776) was a gunboat (also known as a Gundalow) built in 1776 at Skenesboro, New York. It was originally called  prior to launch for service in General Benedict Arnold's fleet on Lake Champlain.

Design
The exact dimensions of New York are not known, but her sister ship , which is preserved and on display at the National Museum of American History, in Washington, D.C., are and would probably be very close to the same.

She was armed with one 12-pounder long gun mounted in the bow, two 9-pounder guns, and eight swivel guns. New York had a crew of 45 men.

Battle of Valcour Island

In the Battle of Valcour Island the American fleet had: eight gundalows, four row galleys, one sloops, and two schooner. The British Fleet had: one square-rigged ship, one Ketch-radeau, two schooners, one gundalow and 28 gunboats.

During the battle, it may have been captained by a Captain Lee, or may have been turned over to a Capt. Reed when Lee, probably due to illness, was unable to sail with General Arnold's little fleet as it got under way from Crown Point 24 August.

New York accompanied the flotilla up the lake, stopped at Willsborough 1 September to repair damage suffered during a severe storm and was at Isle La Motte on the 18th. On the 23rd the American ships retired into a defensive position between Valcour Island and the New York shore to await the British Capt. Thomas Pringle, RN, got his ships under way 4 October.

A week later on the morning of 11 October, the two forces met in the Battle of Valcour Island which resulted in a tactical American defeat but was a great strategic victory for the patriots' cause. Battered during the action off Valcour Island, Arnold's ships slipped through the hands of the British fleet and retired south up the Lake toward Crown Point. About noon on the 13th, the British fleet pulled within range of the Americans and opened fire. Arnold's flotilla fought defiantly for over two hours before their shattered condition forced him to run his ships ashore in a little creek about 10 miles from Crown Point and burn them. With his men, he then retired through the woods to Crown Point.

During the battle, one of the three cannons exploded, killing Lieutenant Thomas Rogers.

But the little fleet had served the American cause well. Its presence on the lake had delayed the British drive from Canada to cut the American colonies in two, while the redcoats were building their own fleet. After the Battle of Valcour Island, winter was too close to permit them to begin the campaign. Thus New York and her plucky little sister ships had bought the Americans a year to prepare for the onslaught, a year which made possible their stirring victory at Saratoga.

New York was the only gunboat to survive the battle, along with 6 other gundalows,4 galleys, and 2 sloops. New York was later stationed at Fort Ticonderoga and fell during the July 1777 siege.

In 1910, the stem of New York was unearthed and can be found at the Lake Champlain Maritime Museum in Vergennes, Vermont.

Notes 
Citations

Bibliography 

Books
 

Online resources

External links 
 The Legacy of the Ships Named New York

Row galleys of the Continental Navy
United States Navy ship names
Ships of the Continental Navy
Ships built in Whitehall, New York
1776 ships
Maritime incidents in 1776